The 2000 NASCAR Winston Cup Series was the 52nd season of professional stock car racing in the United States, and was the 29th modern-era Cup series. The season began on February 13 and ended on November 20. Joe Gibbs Racing driver Bobby Labonte was crowned champion at season's end. The NASCAR Manufacturers' Championship was won by Ford as they captured 14 wins and 234 points to better Pontiac's 11 wins and 213 points. Chevrolet finished third with nine wins and 199 points.

The season was marred by tragedy when Adam Petty and Kenny Irwin Jr. were killed in separate accidents at New Hampshire International Raceway.

This was the final season for three-time Winston Cup Champion Darrell Waltrip. Also, this was unexpectedly the final full-time season for seven-time Winston Cup champion, and perhaps the greatest driver in NASCAR history, Dale Earnhardt, who was killed the following year in the season-opening 2001 Daytona 500.

The 2000 season also marked the final one for various networks that carried NASCAR racing. Because of the new television deal struck on December 15, 1999, it would be the last year for a multitude of these long-time broadcasters. NASCAR on CBS broadcast the final races of its twenty-two-season partnership, ending with the Pepsi 400 at Daytona. NASCAR on TNN and NASCAR on TBS ended their time in the Winston Cup Series; the former's run of ten seasons came to an end at the Checker Auto Parts/Dura Lube 500 at Phoenix, while the latter's abruptly ceased at eighteen seasons following the UAW-GM Quality 500 at Lowe's Motor Speedway (TBS had initially won rights for the new deal, but was replaced by TNT). NASCAR on ESPN, alongside its affiliated programming with ESPN on ABC, ended its initial run of covering NASCAR's top series (both networks returned during the 2007 season); ESPN's first run of twenty seasons concluded with the NAPA 500 at Atlanta, while ABC's then twenty-five nonconsecutive seasons with the sport ended with the Brickyard 400 at Indianapolis.

This was the last season without Jimmie Johnson until 2021, Jason Leffler until 2014 (due to his death shortly after his last Cup start at Pocono in June 2013) and is the last without Kevin Harvick or Kurt Busch (as a full time driver until 2023) as of 2022. Also, 2000 marked the first season since 1986 without Ernie Irvan.

Teams and drivers

Complete schedule

Limited schedule

Schedule

Results

Bud Shootout 

The Bud Shootout, an exhibition race for all Pole Award winners from the previous season, was held February 13 at Daytona International Speedway. Mark Martin drew the pole. The race was broadcast on CBS.

Top 10 results
 88–Dale Jarrett
 24–Jeff Gordon
 40–Sterling Marlin
 20–Tony Stewart
 16–Kevin Lepage
 36–Ken Schrader
 2–Rusty Wallace
 33–Joe Nemechek
 42–Kenny Irwin Jr.
 22–Ward Burton

Notes:
Ricky Rudd suffered a spectacular flip at the checkered flag when he was tapped by Sterling Marlin when Marlin ran into Bobby Labonte. Everyone involved walked away uninjured.

Gatorade 125s 

The Gatorade Twin 125s were run on February 17 at Daytona International Speedway. Dale Jarrett and Ricky Rudd were the polesitters for races 1 and 2, respectively. The Gatorade Twin 125s were  broadcast tape-delayed on February 19 on CBS after the NASCAR Busch Series race.

Race one top 10 results
 94–Bill Elliott
 88–Dale Jarrett
 2–Rusty Wallace
 20–Tony Stewart
 6–Mark Martin
 24–Jeff Gordon
 18–Bobby Labonte
 32–Scott Pruett
 13–Robby Gordon
 12–Jeremy Mayfield
This would be the 1st checkered flag of any kind for Bill Elliott since his 40th career win in the 1994 Southern 500 at Darlington.

Race two top 10 results
 28–Ricky Rudd
 31–Mike Skinner
 22–Ward Burton
 8–Dale Earnhardt Jr.
 7–Michael Waltrip
 15–Derrike Cope
 99–Jeff Burton
 33–Joe Nemechek
 42–Kenny Irwin Jr.
 25–Jerry Nadeau

This would be the first time since 1989 that Dale Earnhardt failed to win one of the Gatorade 125 Races. He would finish 11th in Race 1, resulting him with a 21st place starting spot for the Daytona 500. He would have some very negative comments about the new aerodynamics package following this race, and after the finish of the Daytona 500.

42nd Daytona 500 

The 2000 Daytona 500 was held February 20 at Daytona International Speedway. Dale Jarrett won the pole. The race was televised by CBS.

 88–Dale Jarrett
 99–Jeff Burton
 94–Bill Elliott
 2–Rusty Wallace
 6–Mark Martin
 18–Bobby Labonte
 5–Terry Labonte
 22–Ward Burton
 36–Ken Schrader
 17–Matt Kenseth*

Failed to qualify: 60 –Geoff Bodine, 84-Norm Benning, 72–Jim Sauter, 65–Dan Pardus, 85 –Carl Long, 48–Stanton Barrett, 89-Bobby Gerhart, 96–Greg Sacks, 11 –Brett Bodine, 71-Dave Marcis, 91 –Andy Hillenburg, 27 –Jeff Fuller*, 50 –Ricky Craven, and 34 –David Green

 Dale Jarrett won the Winston No Bull 5 Million Dollar Bonus.
 As of 2022, Dale Jarrett is the last driver to win the Daytona 500 from the pole.
 Ford sweeps the top 5 positions. As of 2022, this was the last time that a manufacturer would sweep the top 5 spots in the Daytona 500.
This would be the 1st time since 1989 that Daytona legend Dale Earnhardt failed to win a NASCAR race in Daytona Speedweeks. However, his streak of winning at least 1 Daytona Speedweeks race would still be alive after winning the IROC Race the day before. This would also be the first time in his Winston Cup career that he failed to finish in the top 10 in all of the speedweek races in the same season. He didn't race in the Bud Shootout, he finished 11th in the 1st race of the Gatorade Twin 125s, and he would finish 21st in this race.
This race was the start of major controversy due to the new aerodynamics package NASCAR officials made for both the Daytona and Talladega races this year since they are the restrictor-plate races. This race only saw 9 lead changes, and the majority of the race led to single file racing, almost 2 full car lengths apart per car. The entire 2000 Speedweeks saw a total of just 14 lead changes. Dale Earnhardt would be very vocal about the negativity of the aerodynamics package following this race.
 This was the last Daytona 500 to be televised by CBS, and thus the last 500 broadcasts for Buddy Baker and Ned Jarrett.
 Due to his failure to qualify, Dave Marcis' streak of making the Daytona 500 for consecutive years that started in 1968 came to an end, totaling 32 years.
 Johnny Benson, driving an unsponsored car for Tyler Jet Motorsports, was surprisingly in the lead with less than 10 laps to go and looked as if he might capture his first Cup win in the biggest event of the season.  After a restart from a late caution flag, Dale Jarrett and Jeff Burton both passed him with four laps to go. Jarrett would wind up winning the race under caution, and Benson finished 12th.
 This was the first Daytona 500 start for Dale Earnhardt Jr. and Matt Kenseth.

Dura Lube/Kmart 400 

The Dura Lube/Kmart 400 was held February 27 at North Carolina Speedway. Rusty Wallace won the pole.

Top ten results
 18–Bobby Labonte
 3–Dale Earnhardt
 22–Ward Burton
 20–Tony Stewart
 88–Dale Jarrett 1 lap down
 28–Ricky Rudd 1 lap down
 12–Jeremy Mayfield 1 lap down
 6–Mark Martin 1 lap down
 1–Steve Park 1 lap down
 24–Jeff Gordon 1 lap down

Failed to qualify: Ricky Craven (No. 50), Scott Pruett (No. 32), Dave Blaney (No. 93), Mike Bliss (No. 14)

CarsDirect.com 400 

The CarsDirect.com 400 was held March 5 at Las Vegas Motor Speedway. Ricky Rudd won the pole.

Top 10 results
 99–Jeff Burton
 20–Tony Stewart
 6–Mark Martin
 94–Bill Elliott
 18–Bobby Labonte
 10–Johnny Benson
 88–Dale Jarrett
 3–Dale Earnhardt
 33–Joe Nemechek
 8–Dale Earnhardt Jr.

Failed to qualify: Rick Mast (No. 41), Mike Bliss (No. 14), Ed Berrier (No. 90), Brett Bodine (No. 11), Dave Marcis (No. 71), Austin Cameron (No. 89)

Jeff Burton had also won the No Bull 5 Million Dollar Bonus.
The race was shortened to 148 laps due to rain.

Cracker Barrel Old Country Store 500 

The Cracker Barrel Old Country Store 500 was held March 12 at Atlanta Motor Speedway. Dale Jarrett won the pole.

Top ten results

 3–Dale Earnhardt
 18–Bobby Labonte
 6–Mark Martin
 1–Steve Park
 33–Joe Nemechek
 97–Chad Little
 91–Todd Bodine
 22–Ward Burton 1 lap down
 24–Jeff Gordon 1 lap down
 94–Bill Elliott 1 lap down

Failed to qualify: Dave Marcis (No. 71), Ed Berrier (No. 90), Johnny Benson (No. 10), Mike Bliss (No. 14), Robby Gordon (No. 13)

The race was highlighted with a photo finish by Dale Earnhardt over Bobby Labonte at a margin of 0.010 seconds.
This was Earnhardt's 75th career NASCAR Winston Cup win and his final win at a non-restrictor plate track. The win made Earnhardt the third driver to win on both configurations of Atlanta Motor Speedway, the others being Bobby Labonte and Jeff Gordon. All three have won on the old 1.522 mile oval and the current 1.54-mile oval.
As of today, with this win in the year 2000, Dale Earnhardt would be 1st, and so far, the only driver in NASCAR history, to score at least 1 win in 4 consecutive decades. He scored his 1st career win in 1979 at Bristol, and then followed it up with 38 wins in the 1980s, and 35 wins in the 1990s.
 Mike Skinner led a race-high 191 laps and looked as if he was going to capture his first Winston Cup points win when an engine failure dropped him out of the race while leading with 20 laps to go. Skinner would finish 30th.

Mall.com 400 

The Mall.com 400 was held March 19 at Darlington Raceway. Jeff Gordon won the pole.

Top ten results

 22–Ward Burton
 88–Dale Jarrett
 3–Dale Earnhardt
 20–Tony Stewart
 99–Jeff Burton
 17–Matt Kenseth
 4–Bobby Hamilton
 24–Jeff Gordon
 6–Mark Martin
 16–Kevin Lepage

Failed to qualify: Derrike Cope (No. 15), Ricky Craven (No. 50), Scott Pruett (No. 32), Wally Dallenbach Jr. (No. 75), Ed Berrier (No. 90)
This was Pontiac's first win at Darlington since 1963 by Joe Weatherly.
It had been 131 races since Ward Burton had gone to victory lane, the last time being the October 1995 race at Rockingham.
This win marked the first time that Ward and Jeff Burton each won a race in the same season.

Food City 500 

The Food City 500 was held March 26 at Bristol Motor Speedway. Steve Park won the pole.

Top ten results

 2–Rusty Wallace
 10–Johnny Benson
 22–Ward Burton
 12–Jeremy Mayfield
 5–Terry Labonte
 18–Bobby Labonte
 1–Steve Park
 24–Jeff Gordon
 99–Jeff Burton
 40–Sterling Marlin

Failed to qualify: Dave Marcis (No. 71), Ricky Craven (No. 50), Ed Berrier (No. 90), Scott Pruett (No. 32)

On lap 390, Jeff Gordon ran over one of Steve Park's old right-side tires that had been left on pit road, ending his chances to win. This incident led to the rule change that pit crews have to bring the right-side tires back to the pit wall during a pit stop.
Rusty Wallace became the 10th driver to win 50+ NASCAR races. He became the first driver since Dale Earnhardt in 1991 to score his 50th career win. He is currently the only driver in history to get his first and 50th career wins at the same track, in the same race.

DirecTV 500 

The DirecTV 500 was held April 2 at Texas Motor Speedway. Terry Labonte won the pole.

Top ten results

 8–Dale Earnhardt Jr.
 99–Jeff Burton
 18–Bobby Labonte
 2–Rusty Wallace
 16–Kevin Lepage
 12–Jeremy Mayfield
 3–Dale Earnhardt
 5–Terry Labonte
 20–Tony Stewart
 28–Ricky Rudd

Failed to qualify: Robby Gordon (No. 13), Dave Marcis (No. 71), Wally Dallenbach Jr. (No. 75), Kyle Petty (No. 44), Todd Bodine (No. 91)

19-year-old Adam Petty became the first fourth-generation athlete in professional sports history when he qualified 33rd for this race. He finished 40th after suffering a blown motor in his only ever Cup Series race. His great-grandfather, NASCAR pioneer Lee Petty, lived to see Adam race in NASCAR's top level. Lee would, unfortunately, pass away just three days later on April 5, at the age of 86, due to an abdominal aortic aneurysm. Adam, who was set to be the future for Petty Enterprises, would die on May 12, only 37 days after his great-grandfather Lee. He was unexpectedly killed in a practice crash for a Busch Series race at New Hampshire Motor Speedway.
 This was Dale Earnhardt Jr.'s first career win, coming in only his 12th start in the Cup series, a then-record for fewest starts to first victory, breaking the record of 16, coincidentally held by his father, Dale Earnhardt.
 Kyle Petty later relieved an injured Elliott Sadler, who suffered shoulder bruising after a cut tire on lap 119.  The tire tore the car apart and the tire hit his shoulder several times.

Goody's Body Pain 500 

The Goody's Body Pain 500 was held April 9 at Martinsville Speedway. Rusty Wallace won the pole.

Top ten results

 6–Mark Martin
 99–Jeff Burton
 7–Michael Waltrip
 24–Jeff Gordon
 88–Dale Jarrett
 20–Tony Stewart
 12–Jeremy Mayfield
 94–Bill Elliott
 3–Dale Earnhardt
 2–Rusty Wallace

Failed to qualify: Wally Dallenbach Jr. (No. 75), Rick Mast (No. 14), Dave Marcis (No. 71), Ed Berrier (No. 90)

This race had 17 cautions for 116 laps, season highs for the 2000 season.
Rusty Wallace dominated, leading 343 of the race's 500 laps, but with 64 laps to go, eventual winner Mark Martin passed Wallace and led until the finish.
This race was dedicated to the memory of Lee Petty, who died on April 5 due to an abdominal aortic aneurysm. He was 86 years old.

DieHard 500 

The DieHard 500 was held April 16 at Talladega Superspeedway. Jeremy Mayfield won the pole.

Top ten results

 24–Jeff Gordon*
 31–Mike Skinner
 3–Dale Earnhardt
 42–Kenny Irwin Jr.
 26–Jimmy Spencer
 6–Mark Martin
 5–Terry Labonte
 40–Sterling Marlin
 44–Kyle Petty
 22–Ward Burton

Failed to qualify: Brett Bodine (No. 11), Kevin Lepage (No. 16), Gary Bradberry* (No. 41), Rick Mast (No. 14), Elliott Sadler (No. 21)

Jeff Gordon became the 11th driver, and the second driver of 2000, to win 50+ NASCAR races, joining Rusty Wallace, who won three weeks prior to Bristol. This is the third time, and currently the last time, in NASCAR history, that two drivers won their 50th career races in the same year, a feat that had not been accomplished since 1978 when Cale Yarborough and Bobby Allison won their 50th race in the same year. The first time was 1965 when Junior Johnson and Ned Jarrett both won their 50th, yet final career races, in the same year.
Gordon is the youngest driver, and the quickest driver ever to win 50 NASCAR races. He accomplished this feat in 232 NASCAR starts, and he did it at 28 years old.
Gordon also won the race from the 36th starting spot.
Gordon finished a Career Grand Slam.
This was the last race attempted by Larry Hedrick Motorsports. This was due to a lack of funding after a deal with infamous sponsor Big Daddy's BBQ Sauce fell apart as the company never paid any money to Hedrick.
 Last race for Bud Moore Engineering (which had been sold to businessmen Robert and Randy Finley earlier in the offseason), as the #15 car driven by Ted Musgrave would finished 35th after crashing out during the big one,  the team would fold after failing to qualify for the Coca-Cola 600 at Charlotte the following month, Moore originally planned to attempt to bring the #15 car to qualify for the Pepsi 400 at Daytona in July, but later withdrew due to lack of funding.

NAPA Auto Parts 500 

The NAPA Auto Parts 500 was held April 30 at California Speedway. Mike Skinner won the pole.

Top ten results

 12–Jeremy Mayfield*
 18–Bobby Labonte
 17–Matt Kenseth
 28–Ricky Rudd
 99–Jeff Burton
 22–Ward Burton
 31–Mike Skinner
 2–Rusty Wallace
 88–Dale Jarrett
 20–Tony Stewart

Failed to qualify: Dave Marcis (No. 71), Ed Berrier (No. 90), Dwayne Leik (No. 72)

Jeremy Mayfield was fined 151 points and crew chief Peter Sospenzo was fined and suspended after this race for a rules infraction not related to the running of this event. The fine was a result of actions taken at the previous race, the April 16 DieHard 500 at Talladega Superspeedway. NASCAR delayed the penalty in order to research the motive behind the infraction.  
 Bobby Labonte took the points to lead after gaining it at Darlington and losing it at Talladega. He would keep it for the remainder of 2000.
Mayfield's win set a NASCAR all-time record with 10 different drivers winning the first 10 races of the season. As of 2020, this record still stands.

Pontiac Excitement 400 

The Pontiac Excitement 400 was held May 6 at Richmond International Raceway. Rusty Wallace won the pole.

Top ten results

 8–Dale Earnhardt Jr.
 5–Terry Labonte
 88–Dale Jarrett
 28–Ricky Rudd
 2–Rusty Wallace
 22–Ward Burton
 99–Jeff Burton
 20–Tony Stewart
 94–Bill Elliott
 3–Dale Earnhardt

Failed to qualify: Rick Mast (No. 14), Darrell Waltrip (No. 66), Dave Marcis (No. 71), Ed Berrier (No. 90)

Dale Earnhardt Jr. became the first repeat winner in this season.
This was Darrell Waltrip's first DNQ this season after having exhausted his past champion's provisionals.

The Winston 

The Winston, the all-star race for all past champions and recent winners, was held May 20 at Lowe's Motor Speedway.

Top ten results

 8–Dale Earnhardt Jr.
 88–Dale Jarrett
 3–Dale Earnhardt
 25–Jerry Nadeau
 99–Jeff Burton
 5–Terry Labonte
 2–Rusty Wallace
 94–Bill Elliott
 18–Bobby Labonte
 22–Ward Burton

Dale Earnhardt Jr. was an automatic entry with two wins in the season and won in his first All-Star Race start. He also became the first driver to win an All-Star Race in his rookie season.
This was the 16th and final time in their careers that Darrell Waltrip and Dale Earnhardt competed in the Winston. Waltrip retired at the end of 2000 and called the 2001 race from the booth, and Earnhardt was unexpectedly killed the following season at the 2001 Daytona 500. They are also the only two drivers in NASCAR history to compete in the first 16 races of the Winston.
This was the final appearance of Kenny Irwin Jr. in The Winston, as he was killed in a practice crash at New Hampshire two months later. Irwin, who was winless in his Cup Series career, received an automatic entry in the starting grid due to the No. 42 team's win with Joe Nemechek at the 1999 Dura Lube/Kmart 300.

Coca-Cola 600 

The Coca-Cola 600 was held May 28 at Lowe's Motor Speedway. Dale Earnhardt Jr. won the pole.

Top ten results

 17–Matt Kenseth
 18–Bobby Labonte
 3–Dale Earnhardt
 8–Dale Earnhardt Jr.
 88–Dale Jarrett
 12–Jeremy Mayfield
 31–Mike Skinner
 2–Rusty Wallace
 1–Steve Park
 24–Jeff Gordon

Failed to qualify: Ted Musgrave (No. 15), Steve Grissom (No. 44), Ed Berrier (No. 90), Darrell Waltrip (No. 66), Dave Marcis (No. 71)

Carl Long, who qualified in the No. 85 Mansion Motorsports entry, gave up his spot for Darrell Waltrip to compete in his final Coca-Cola 600. Darrell would finish the race 36th, 14 laps down to the winner.
The race was stopped on lap 254 by a 51-minute red flag due to rain.
This was Matt Kenseth's first career victory, the first rookie ever to win the Coca-Cola 600.
This would be the first time in NASCAR history that two rookies won in the same season (Dale Earnhardt Jr. won twice prior to Kenseth's win).
After winning the pole with a new track qualifying record, Dale Earnhardt Jr. was a leading contender. Earnhardt Jr. led a race-high 175 laps, at one time overtaking his father for the lead after a restart.
Hendrick Motorsports driver Jerry Nadeau led 115 laps, most of them in the first half in a breakout performance. However, just after the rain delay, various engine problems dropped him from contention. Nadeau's night came to an end when his engine expired on lap 360.
Robby Gordon was competing in the Indianapolis 500, where the start was rain-delayed by three hours. P. J. Jones started in place of Gordon in the No. 13 Ford. After finishing 6th at Indy, Gordon decided to fly to Charlotte anyway, arriving during the red flag at lap 254 and drove the remainder of this race. The car finished 35th, 11 laps behind the leader. Tony Stewart competed in both races in the previous season.
John Andretti, who was dealing with rib injuries suffered in a crash in The Winston, started the race in the No. 43 Pontiac. Andretti drove until lap 81 when he was relieved by Tim Fedewa. The car would finish 31st, 7 laps down to the winner.

MBNA Platinum 400 

The MBNA Platinum 400 was held June 4 at Dover Downs International Speedway. Rusty Wallace won the pole.

Top ten results

 20–Tony Stewart
 17–Matt Kenseth
 18–Bobby Labonte
 88–Dale Jarrett
 28–Ricky Rudd
 3–Dale Earnhardt 1 lap down
 33–Joe Nemechek 2 laps down
 22–Ward Burton 2 laps down
 31–Mike Skinner 2 laps down
 8–Dale Earnhardt Jr. 2 laps down

Failed to qualify: Kyle Petty* (No. 44), Carl Long (No. 85)
Stewart led 242 of 400 laps and moved up to 9th place in points.
Kyle Petty actually ran this race for John Andretti. They made the driver swap at the first caution. This was Kyle's first race since the death of his son Adam. The car would finish 13th, 2 laps down to the winner.

Kmart 400 

The Kmart 400 was held June 11 at Michigan Speedway. Bobby Labonte won the pole.

Top ten results

 20–Tony Stewart
 3–Dale Earnhardt
 18–Bobby Labonte
 88–Dale Jarrett
 77–Robert Pressley
 22–Ward Burton
 2–Rusty Wallace
 94–Bill Elliott
 43–John Andretti
 40–Sterling Marlin

Failed to qualify: Darrell Waltrip (No. 66), Ricky Craven (No. 50), Dave Marcis (No. 71)

Elliott Sadler, driver of the No. 21 car went for a wild ride in practice, flipping 12 times after blowing a tire on the front stretch. He was not injured.
The race was shortened to 194 laps due to darkness caused by two rain delays. Due to the rain delay, race coverage was moved from CBS to TNN but retained the CBS announcer team and graphics.
Tony Stewart became the first back-to-back winner of the year 2000 other than Dale Earnhardt Jr. who became the first rookie to win repeat wins in 2000 prior to his win at Richmond back in May.

Pocono 500 

The Pocono 500 was scheduled for June 18 but was held June 19 at Pocono Raceway due to rain. Rusty Wallace won the pole.

Top ten results

 12–Jeremy Mayfield
 88–Dale Jarrett
 28–Ricky Rudd
 3–Dale Earnhardt
 6–Mark Martin
 20–Tony Stewart
 99–Jeff Burton
 24–Jeff Gordon
 31–Mike Skinner
 2–Rusty Wallace

Failed to qualify: Darrell Waltrip (No. 66), Dwayne Leik (No. 72), Bill Baird (No. 52)

This race is remembered for Mayfield getting Dale Earnhardt to lose on the final lap in the final turn to move him out of the way and take the win by using a patented Earnhardt move.

Save Mart/Kragen 350 

The Save Mart/Kragen 350 was held June 25 at Sears Point Raceway. Rusty Wallace won the pole.

Top ten results

 24–Jeff Gordon
 40–Sterling Marlin
 6–Mark Martin
 18–Bobby Labonte
 28–Ricky Rudd
 3–Dale Earnhardt
 88–Dale Jarrett
 25–Jerry Nadeau
 13–Robby Gordon
 20–Tony Stewart

Failed to qualify: Rick Mast (No. 14), Geoff Bodine (No. 60), R. K. Smith (No. 71)

During qualifying, Ward Burton flipped.
Jeff Gordon won his 6th consecutive road course race, an all-time record, and as of 2020, the only driver to accomplish that feat, in NASCAR history.

Pepsi 400 

The Pepsi 400 was held July 1 at Daytona International Speedway. Dale Jarrett won the pole. This was the final Winston Cup race that was televised on CBS.

Top ten results

 99–Jeff Burton
 88–Dale Jarrett
 2–Rusty Wallace
 6–Mark Martin
 28–Ricky Rudd
 20–Tony Stewart
 22–Ward Burton
 3–Dale Earnhardt
 31–Mike Skinner
 24–Jeff Gordon

Failed to qualify: Brett Bodine (No. 11), Dave Marcis (No. 71), Robby Gordon (No. 13)

Last Winston Cup race for Kenny Irwin Jr., who died on July 7 of injuries sustained at New Hampshire. He finished 22nd, on the lead lap.
Last Winston Cup race to be televised on CBS. CBS had been with NASCAR for 22 years, starting with the 1979 Daytona 500.

thatlook.com 300 

The thatlook.com 300 was held July 9 at New Hampshire International Speedway. Rusty Wallace won the pole.

Top ten results

 20–Tony Stewart
 33–Joe Nemechek
 6–Mark Martin
 25–Jerry Nadeau
 24–Jeff Gordon
 3–Dale Earnhardt
 88–Dale Jarrett
 12–Jeremy Mayfield
 18–Bobby Labonte
 28–Ricky Rudd

Failed to qualify: Dave Marcis (No. 71)

Withdrawn: Kenny Irwin Jr. (No. 42)

The race was shortened to 273 laps due to rain.
The weekend was marked by tragedy as Kenny Irwin Jr. was killed in a Turn 3 practice crash on July 7. Race winner Tony Stewart later gave the race trophy to Irwin's parents.
Ironically Kenny's death happened on the same day it was announced that Chip Ganassi had purchased majority interest in the Felix Sabates team.
First Pontiac to win at Loudon since Rusty Wallace won the inaugural running in 1993.
Kenny Irwin's teammate on the SABCO team, Sterling Marlin, declined to run in qualifying following Irwin's death; choosing to use a provisional to enter the race. He finished 1 lap down to the leader in 25th.
Owner of car number 42 Felix Sabates would change the car number for the remainder of the season to 01. Three different drivers would finish the season in Kenny's former ride, Ted Musgrave, P. J. Jones, and Bobby Hamilton Jr.

Pennsylvania 500 

The Pennsylvania 500 was held July 23 at Pocono Raceway. Tony Stewart won the pole.

Top ten results

 2–Rusty Wallace
 99–Jeff Burton
 24–Jeff Gordon
 88–Dale Jarrett
 17–Matt Kenseth
 18–Bobby Labonte
 31–Mike Skinner
 14–Rick Mast
 26–Jimmy Spencer
 12–Jeremy Mayfield

Failed to qualify: Geoff Bodine (No. 60), Carl Long (No. 85)

Jeremy Mayfield was less than a lap away from the Pocono sweep when a cut tire sent him from the lead to 10th place.
First time since 1996 that Rusty Wallace won multiple races in a season.
Terry Labonte had Rich Bickle relieve him at the first caution period, who drove to an 11th-place finish, on the lead lap.

Brickyard 400 

The Brickyard 400 was held August 5 at Indianapolis Motor Speedway. Ricky Rudd won the pole.

Top ten results

 18–Bobby Labonte
 2–Rusty Wallace
 94–Bill Elliott
 25–Jerry Nadeau
 20–Tony Stewart
 99–Jeff Burton
 88–Dale Jarrett
 3–Dale Earnhardt
 31–Mike Skinner
 32–Scott Pruett

Failed to qualify: David Keith (No. 95), Rich Bickle (No. 61), Dave Marcis (No. 71), Robby Gordon (No. 13), Steve Grissom (No. 44), Bill Baird (No. 52)

Rusty Wallace led a dominating 110 laps of the race's 160, but it was a hard-charging Bobby Labonte who caught and passed Rusty to lead the last 15 laps and win the race.
This race has the record for the fastest Brickyard 400, with only 2 cautions and an average speed of 155.912 mph.
This was the third straight year that the points leader coming into this race would win the Brickyard 400, and still retain the points lead for the rest of the season, and go on to win the NASCAR Winston Cup Championship. Jeff Gordon did it in 1998, Dale Jarrett in 1999, and Bobby Labonte in 2000.
Terry Labonte was forced to miss this and the next race due to inner ear injuries suffered at Pocono. At the time, he held the record for consecutive starts, with 655.
The race was ABC's last broadcast of the NASCAR Winston Cup Series until the 2007 fall Richmond race (in which the series was renamed to NASCAR Nextel Cup Series) as part of the ESPN group of networks.

Global Crossing @ The Glen 

The Global Crossing @ The Glen was held August 13 at Watkins Glen International. Due to qualifying being rained out, the starting lineup was set by owner's points, so Bobby Labonte was awarded pole position.

Top ten results

 1–Steve Park
 6–Mark Martin
 99–Jeff Burton
 13–Robby Gordon
 18–Bobby Labonte
 20–Tony Stewart
 88–Dale Jarrett
 33–Joe Nemechek
 75–Wally Dallenbach Jr.
 17–Matt Kenseth

Failed to qualify: Boris Said (No. 23), Scott Pruett (No. 32), R. K. Smith (No. 71), Brett Bodine (No. 11), Brian Simo (No. 90)

 This was Steve Park's first career Winston Cup victory.
Jeff Gordon, winner of the last six road course races, did not win a seventh, as he and Tony Stewart collided with each other on lap 2, causing him to hit the guardrail, eventually finishing in the 23rd position.

Pepsi 400 presented by Meijer 

The Pepsi 400 presented by Meijer was held August 20 at Michigan Speedway. Dale Earnhardt Jr. won the pole.

Top ten results

 2–Rusty Wallace
 28–Ricky Rudd
 18–Bobby Labonte
 88–Dale Jarrett
 10–Johnny Benson
 3–Dale Earnhardt
 26–Jimmy Spencer
 17–Matt Kenseth
 22–Ward Burton
 99–Jeff Burton

Failed to qualify: Geoff Bodine (No. 60), Darrell Waltrip (No. 66), Stacy Compton (No. 9), Kyle Petty (No. 44), David Keith (No. 95), Carl Long (No. 85)

This race saw Dale Earnhardt's eldest son Kerry Earnhardt make his NASCAR Winston Cup Series debut. The presence of Dale Earnhardt, Dale Earnhardt Jr., and Kerry made this the only time in NASCAR's modern era, and only the second time in NASCAR's history altogether that a father would race against two of his sons. Lee Petty had previously accomplished that feat with sons Richard and Maurice back in 1960. It would be a good day for the elder Earnhardt, as he would finish in the sixth position, but both of his sons had troubles during the race. Dale Jr. blew an engine en route to a 31st-place finish, while Kerry fell victim to an early accident and finished last in the 43 car field.

goracing.com 500 presented by SkyTel 

The goracing.com 500 presented by SkyTel was held August 26 at Bristol Motor Speedway. Rusty Wallace won the pole.

Top ten results

 2–Rusty Wallace
 20–Tony Stewart
 6–Mark Martin
 3–Dale Earnhardt
 1–Steve Park
 99–Jeff Burton
 21–Elliott Sadler
 40–Sterling Marlin
 88–Dale Jarrett
 28–Ricky Rudd

Failed to qualify: Mike Bliss (No. 27), Hut Stricklin (No. 90), Carl Long (No. 85), Ricky Craven (No. 50)

Despite winning the pole for this race, and also winning his fourth and final race of the year, this was Rusty Wallace's first win of the season from the pole. It took him eight pole positions of 2000 to finally score the win from that spot. The race marked the last win from the pole in Wallace's career.
With this win, Wallace tied Dale Earnhardt and Cale Yarborough for second place all-time as a nine-time winner at Bristol. Darrell Waltrip is the only winner with more than ten, winning 12 races. Wallace's nine wins at Bristol were the most at any one track in his career.
Wallace swept the Bristol races, the first time he swept a track since Martinsville in 1994. It was also the last time that Wallace swept both of the races at a track
Wallace became the second driver of 2000 to win back-to-back races, joining Tony Stewart.
Final back-to-back wins for Wallace.
Final time in his career that Wallace won multiple races in a season.

Pepsi Southern 500 presented by Kmart 

The Pepsi Southern 500 presented by Kmart was held September 3 at Darlington Raceway. Jeremy Mayfield won the pole.

Top ten results

 18–Bobby Labonte
 99–Jeff Burton
 3–Dale Earnhardt
 24–Jeff Gordon
 88–Dale Jarrett
 22–Ward Burton
 16–Kevin Lepage
 28–Ricky Rudd
 20–Tony Stewart
 1–Steve Park

Failed to qualify: Stacy Compton (No. 9)
The race was shortened to 328 laps due to thunderstorms. Due to the rain delay, race coverage was moved from ESPN to ESPN2 but retained ESPN's announcer team and graphics. 
Bobby Labonte won the race from the 37th starting position. the worst starting spot to victory since Jeff Gordon at Talladega when he started 36th.
Terry and Bobby Labonte became the first set of brothers to win the Southern 500.
This was the first win for Pontiac in the Southern 500 since Buck Baker in 1960.
This would be the 800th career Winston Cup start for Darrell Waltrip. He became the 3rd driver to accomplish this feat.
This was the last career Winston Cup race in which Darrell Waltrip led a lap.

Chevrolet Monte Carlo 400 

The Chevrolet Monte Carlo 400 was held September 9 at Richmond International Raceway. Jeff Burton won the pole.

Top ten results

 24–Jeff Gordon
 3–Dale Earnhardt
 6–Mark Martin
 1–Steve Park
 99–Jeff Burton
 20–Tony Stewart
 10–Johnny Benson
 22–Ward Burton
 28–Ricky Rudd
 25–Jerry Nadeau

Failed to qualify: Mike Bliss (No. 27), Robby Gordon (No. 13), Darrell Waltrip (No. 66), Dave Marcis (No. 71)

Gordon held off a hard-charging Dale Earnhardt, denying Earnhardt a million-dollar bonus as being eligible for the No Bull 5 program in this event.
The race marked the third and final win for Gordon in 2000, the lowest winning total for him since 1994.
First time since 1994 that Jeff Gordon failed to win back-to-back races.
Casey Atwood, along with Ray Evernham's new team Evernham Motorsports, made their NASCAR Winston Cup Series debut in the 19 car, driving a Ford (the team switched to Dodge in 2001 due to the team being a huge part of Dodge's return into NASCAR). Atwood finished his debut in 19th place, two laps down.
This would be the final time that Darrell Waltrip failed to qualify for a Winston Cup race.

Dura Lube 300 sponsored by Kmart 

The Dura Lube 300 sponsored by Kmart was held September 17 at New Hampshire International Speedway. Bobby Labonte won the pole.

Top ten results

 99–Jeff Burton
 18–Bobby Labonte
 28–Ricky Rudd
 88–Dale Jarrett
 2–Rusty Wallace
 24–Jeff Gordon
 43–John Andretti
 6–Mark Martin
 33–Joe Nemechek
 36–Ken Schrader

Failed to qualify: Steve Grissom (No. 44), Dave Marcis (No. 71)

This race had the distinction of being the only Cup race outside of Daytona and Talladega to run a restrictor-plate race since the adoption of the current 358 cubic inch formula. After Adam Petty's fatal crash in the Busch Series practice in May and Kenny Irwin Jr.'s fatal crash in the Cup Series practice in July, NASCAR decided to run restrictor plates. Adding restrictor plates did have the desired result of slowing down the cars drastically, but at the same time restricted passing so much that Jeff Burton led all 300 laps. This lack of passing was so uncompetitive that, for Cup cars only, the restrictor plates were gone for the very next race. Replacing the plates was an engine kill switch, which was located on the steering wheel, and it allowed drivers to halt the car if their throttle was stuck open going too hard into the turns.
Jeff Burton led all 300 laps. As of 2020, this was the last time that a driver led every single lap in a NASCAR points race. The closest a driver came to accomplishing this feat was in 2016 when Martin Truex Jr. led 392 of 400 laps and won the Coca-Cola 600 at Charlotte.

MBNA.com 400 

The MBNA.com 400 was held September 24 at Dover Downs International Speedway. Jeremy Mayfield won the pole.

Top ten results

 20–Tony Stewart
 10–Johnny Benson
 28–Ricky Rudd
 1–Steve Park
 18–Bobby Labonte
 6–Mark Martin
 33–Joe Nemechek
 2–Rusty Wallace
 24–Jeff Gordon
 14–Rick Mast 1 lap down

Failed to qualify: Hut Stricklin (No. 90), Joe Bessey (No. 60)

This was Kurt Busch's first race in the Cup series, having replaced Chad Little as the driver of the No. 97 Ford. Busch started 10th and finished 18th.
This was the last race to air on TNN under "The Nashville Network" name.

NAPA Autocare 500 

The NAPA Autocare 500 was held October 1 at Martinsville Speedway. Tony Stewart won the pole.

Top ten results

 20–Tony Stewart
 3–Dale Earnhardt
 99–Jeff Burton
 28–Ricky Rudd
 24–Jeff Gordon
 88–Dale Jarrett
 26–Jimmy Spencer
 31–Mike Skinner
 40–Sterling Marlin
 18–Bobby Labonte

Failed to qualify: Scott Pruett (No. 32), Steve Grissom (No. 44), Carl Long (No. 85), Dave Marcis (No. 71), Rich Bickle (No. 60)
 First time Tony Stewart wins from the Pole.

UAW-GM Quality 500 

The UAW-GM Quality 500 was held October 8 at Lowe's Motor Speedway. Jeff Gordon won the pole.

Top ten results

 18–Bobby Labonte
 12–Jeremy Mayfield
 28–Ricky Rudd
 20–Tony Stewart
 6–Mark Martin
 99–Jeff Burton
 1–Steve Park
 10–Johnny Benson
 17–Matt Kenseth
 22–Ward Burton

Failed to qualify: Scott Pruett (No. 32), Ricky Craven (No. 50), Steve Grissom (No. 44), Carl Long (No. 85), Stacy Compton (No. 9), Dave Marcis (No. 71)
This was the final race aired on TBS.
This was Labonte's fourth and final win of 2000, holding a points lead of 252 over Jeff Burton following the race.

Winston 500 presented by UPS 

The Winston 500 was held on October 15 at Talladega Superspeedway. Joe Nemechek won the pole. Bill Elliott led the most laps.

Top ten results

 3–Dale Earnhardt
 55–Kenny Wallace
 33–Joe Nemechek
 24–Jeff Gordon
 5–Terry Labonte
 31–Mike Skinner*
 6–Mark Martin
 2–Rusty Wallace
 27–Mike Bliss
 17–Matt Kenseth

Failed to qualify: Wally Dallenbach Jr. (No. 75), Blaise Alexander (No. 91), Hut Stricklin (No. 90)

This would be Dale Earnhardt's 76th and final career NASCAR Winston Cup Series victory, as he would be tragically killed the following season in the 2001 Daytona 500, the very 1st race of the year.
This would be Dale Earnhardt's 67th and final victory with Richard Childress Racing. His 67 wins ranged 17 seasons, from 1984 to 2000. As of 2022, Earnhardt is still the winningest driver for that team.
Not only that this was his 76th win, but this would be the 100th,  and final victory overall, for Dale Earnhardt in NASCAR Winston Cup Racing. Along with his 76 points wins, he managed to win 24 non-points exhibition races throughout his career. He would become only the 3rd driver in NASCAR history to win a total of 100+ races, joining Richard Petty and David Pearson. Former rival Jeff Gordon would eventually become the 4th, and as of 2022, the most recent driver to win a total of 100+ races, with 104 victories.
This would be the last time in a long time that the legendary #3 went to victory lane in the Cup Series. After Dale Earnhardt's unexpected death the following season in the 2001 Daytona 500, car owner Richard Childress immediately changed the number from 3 to 29 and recruited full-time Busch Series star Kevin Harvick to replace the legendary driver. After Harvick left in 2013, Childress changed the #29 back to the legendary #3 and hired his grandson Austin Dillon in 2014. Finally, after almost 17 years and 592 consecutive races since this event, Austin Dillon would take the legendary #3 back to victory lane in the 2017 Coca-Cola 600. It would be his 1st career NASCAR Cup Series win. As of 2022, Dillon is still the driver of the legendary Richard Childress #3 car.
This race is strongly remembered for Dale Earnhardt's late-race charge from the back to the front. With 5 laps to go, Earnhardt was racing midpack, battling for the 18th position, but somehow, unbelievably, in just 3 laps, he stormed his way through the pack from the 18th spot by using just the middle lane. He would then find himself up front, battling for the lead with less than 2 laps to go. He actually ended up taking the lead from both, ironically, his teammate Mike Skinner, and son Dale Earnhardt Jr., in the tri-oval, coming to the white flag. After a hard, but short, 3 lap battle with the pack and trying to get to the front, Earnhardt would officially cross the start/finish line 1st on the white flag lap. Then he held off Andy Petree Racing teammates Kenny Wallace and Joe Nemechek for the entire last lap to score the win.
This was Dale Earnhardt's first, and only, Winston No Bull 5 Million Dollar Bonus win.
This was Earnhardt's 10th career Talladega win, the most wins at Talladega by a driver as of 2020.
10 wins at Talladega is the most wins at one track in Dale Earnhardt's legendary career. This 10th win broke him out of a four-way tie for most wins at one track. His second-most wins at one track are nine each at three tracks: Atlanta, Bristol, and Darlington.
This race was the debut of a new aerodynamics package for both Daytona and Talladega restrictor-plate races. This new package was supposed to go into effect starting in the 2001 Daytona 500, but due to the controversy of the 1st 3 plate races earlier in the season, the new rules package took effect immediately in this race. The new package for this race saw a lot of passing and had a total of 49 lead changes among 21 different drivers.
This was the last career Winston Cup race that Dave Marcis led a lap.
This was the last Cup race sponsored by a tobacco product.
This was Mike Skinner's nearest-miss of his Cup Series career as he led with 2 laps to go in RCR's #31 Lowe's Chevrolet, only to finish 6th after losing the lead before the white flag waved. Skinner also finished 2nd at Talladega earlier in the year.
This is the most recent points race with none of Kurt Busch, Ryan Newman, or Kevin Harvick making the field.

Pop Secret Microwave Popcorn 400 

The Pop Secret Microwave Popcorn 400 was held October 22 at North Carolina Speedway. Jeremy Mayfield won the pole.

Top ten results

 88–Dale Jarrett
 24–Jeff Gordon
 28–Ricky Rudd
 99–Jeff Burton
 2–Rusty Wallace
 1–Steve Park
 20–Tony Stewart
 22–Ward Burton
 4–Bobby Hamilton
 33–Joe Nemechek

Failed to qualify: Ted Musgrave (No. 01), Rich Bickle (No. 60), Steve Grissom (No. 44), Hut Stricklin (No. 90), Stacy Compton (No. 9)
This was Dale Jarrett's first win since the Daytona 500 back in February.
The race also marked Jarrett's first Rockingham win.
This was the first race to air on TNN under "The National Network" name.

Checker Auto Parts/Dura Lube 500 

The Checker Auto Parts/Dura Lube 500 was held November 5 at Phoenix International Raceway. Rusty Wallace won the pole.

Top ten results

 99–Jeff Burton
 12–Jeremy Mayfield
 1–Steve Park
 2–Rusty Wallace
 18–Bobby Labonte
 6–Mark Martin
 24–Jeff Gordon
 93–Dave Blaney
 3–Dale Earnhardt
 88–Dale Jarrett

Failed to qualify: Stacy Compton (No. 9), Steve Grissom (No. 44), Robby Gordon (No. 13), Dave Marcis (No. 71), Hut Stricklin (No. 90)

It was the last race televised by The Nashville Network (during the broadcast, known as The National Network), which was later called Spike, and is now called Paramount Network.
Ryan Newman made his NASCAR debut starting 10th and finishing 41st.

Pennzoil 400 presented by Discount Auto Parts 

The Pennzoil 400 presented by Discount Auto Parts was held November 12 at Homestead-Miami Speedway. Steve Park won the pole.

Top ten results

 20–Tony Stewart
 12–Jeremy Mayfield
 6–Mark Martin
 18–Bobby Labonte
 26–Jimmy Spencer
 28–Ricky Rudd
 24–Jeff Gordon 1 lap down
 1–Steve Park 1 lap down
 93–Dave Blaney 2 laps down
 19–Casey Atwood 2 laps down

Failed to qualify: Kyle Petty (No. 45), Hut Stricklin (No. 90), Ricky Craven (No. 50), Dave Marcis (No. 71), Steve Grissom (No. 44), Norm Benning (No. 84), Hermie Sadler (No. 60), Ted Musgrave (No. 01)
It was Tony Stewart's sixth win of the year, most of all drivers for the season.
Bobby Labonte clinched the championship by finishing 4th with only one race left. It was the 2nd straight year that the championship was clinched at Homestead. He led the standings by 256 points over Jeff Burton going into the season finale at Atlanta.
This was Joe Gibbs' first Winston Cup Championship as an owner since he formed his racing team back in 1992.
Casey Atwood scored his first career top-ten finish in the Cup Series.

NAPA 500 

The NAPA 500 was scheduled for November 19, but was held on November 20 due to a rain delay at the Atlanta Motor Speedway. Jeff Gordon won the pole.

Top ten results

 25–Jerry Nadeau
 3–Dale Earnhardt
 22–Ward Burton
 24–Jeff Gordon
 18–Bobby Labonte
 31–Mike Skinner
 2–Rusty Wallace
 40–Sterling Marlin
 17–Matt Kenseth 1 lap down
 10–Johnny Benson 1 lap down

Failed to qualify: Stacy Compton (No. 9), Hermie Sadler* (No. 60), Hut Stricklin (No. 90), Dick Trickle (No. 71), Blaise Alexander (No. 91), Morgan Shepherd (No. 80), Tim Sauter (No. 61), Larry Foyt (No. 41), Kevin Lepage (No. 16), Carl Long (No. 85), Mike Bliss (No. 27), Steve Grissom (No. 44), Norm Benning (No. 84)

Because of a deal that gave broadcasting rights to Fox, FX, NBC, and TNT, this was ESPN's last Winston Cup race until the station along with ABC was brought back to NASCAR in 2007. It is remembered for Bob Jenkins making a farewell speech and his fellow commentator Benny Parsons and Ned Jarrett almost making him cry as they said goodbye on TV. Jenkins introduced a video from ESPN thanking all the fans, simply stating "Without you, there would have been no magic."
The race was not Parsons' final race as a color commentator. He would continue in the position with NBC and TNT until he died in January 2007.
This was Ned Jarrett's final Winston Cup race as a full-time color commentator.  ESPN brought him back for a Busch race at Charlotte in 2007 and NBC brought Jarrett in the mid-2010s during Darlington Raceway throwback weekends.
Jerry Nadeau scores his first and only victory of his career.
This was Scott Wimmer's first Cup start.
This was the 809th and final career Cup Series start for Darrell Waltrip, who would end his driving career and start his broadcasting career in 2001 for NASCAR on FOX.
With his 2nd-place finish in this race, Dale Earnhardt would officially pass Jeff Burton to finish 2nd in the championship standings, 265 points behind Bobby Labonte. Burton would finish 12th in this event, finishing 3rd in points. This would be Earnhardt's 10th time finishing either 1st or 2nd in the standings. He would become the 2nd, and as of 2021, the most recent driver, to accomplish this feat. Richard Petty has the all-time record of 13 finishes of either 1st or 2nd in points (7 championships, 6 runner-up finishes). However, Dale Earnhardt is the only driver in NASCAR history to finish either 1st or 2nd in the championship standings 10 times under one points system.
 This was the last race for Galaxy Motorsports after 22 years since the team was established in 1978 under RahMoc Enterprises, it was rumored that the team was going to field the #75 car for 2001 with Pizza Hut as the primary sponsor, but the team would shut down before the season began due to lack of finances.
This was Dale Earnhardt's unexpectedly last lead lap and top-five finish in a Winston Cup points event as he would be tragically killed the following season in the Daytona 500, the very 1st race of the 2001 season.
With his 5th-place finish, Bobby Labonte would become the 2nd, and as of 2021, the most recent driver, to finish every single race in his championship season (no DNFs). Cale Yarborough became the 1st driver to accomplish this feat in 1977.
Champion Bobby Labonte and Runner-Up Dale Earnhardt were the only 2 drivers to not score a DNF in the 2000 season.
The cars of Scott Wimmer, Larry Foyt and Tim Sauter were initially entered in the weekend's ARCA race at Atlanta, but when all three DNQ'd due to ARCA qualifying being rained out, they elected to attempt the Cup race instead as the cars and rules packages were very similar. Foyt and Sauter failed to make the race, but Wimmer did and actually led 9 laps, including three under green flag conditions, by staying on track under a caution when everybody else pitted. Wimmer would finish three laps down in 22nd position.
This was the last race attempted by Joe Bessey Racing, as the team would shut down after failing to qualify to this race, it was rumored that Joe Bessey had attempted to field the #60 car for 2001 with Hermie Sadler driving the vehicle with TracFone Wireless and World Championship Wrestling as the sponsors, and it was set to be qualifying for the 2001 Dura Lube 400 at Rockingham, But Bessey would withdrawal the car from qualifying for this race due to financial and funding problems.

Drivers' championship

(key) Bold - Pole position awarded by time. Italics - Pole position set by owner's points standings. * – Most laps led.

Rookie of the Year 

In the preseason, the two favorites for the award were Matt Kenseth and Dale Earnhardt Jr. While Earnhardt had the name, the popularity, and the two wins, Kenseth had more consistency and was able to claim the title by a narrow margin. The third-place finisher was Dave Blaney, who had finished 31st in points. Scott Pruett and Stacy Compton showed promise in the beginning of the year, but eventually lost momentum and bottomed out at the end of the year. Mike Bliss started the year with A. J. Foyt Racing, was released after 4 races, then finished the season with Eel River Racing. Ed Berrier and Jeff Fuller finished towards the bottom, mainly due to being released from their rides during the season.

See also
2000 NASCAR Busch Series
2000 NASCAR Craftsman Truck Series

References

External links 
Winston Cup Standings and Statistics for 2000

 
NASCAR Cup Series seasons